Terry Bruce may refer to:

 Terry Bruce (politician) (born 1975), Republican member of the Kansas Senate
 Terry L. Bruce (born 1944), U.S. Representative from Illinois